Route 438, also known as Croque Road, is a  east–west highway on the Great Northern Peninsula of Newfoundland in the Canadian Province of Newfoundland and Labrador. It connects the communities of Croque and St. Julien's (also known as Grandois) with Route 432 (Main Brook Highway) and the town of Main Brook. The entire length of Route 438 is a narrow, winding, gravel road.

Route description
It now enters the community of Croque, where it makes a left onto a straighter path northward at the western end of the community. The highway passes through more hilly terrain before arriving at the coastline and St. Julien's (also known as Grandois), where Route 438 comes to a dead end at the northern edge of town.

Major intersections

References

438